Jamie Miller (born September 9, 1997 in Cardiff, Wales) is a Welsh singer and musician currently based in Los Angeles. He featured on The Voice UK in 2017, where he came in third place. Following The Voice, he signed a deal with Atlantic Records and is currently working on his debut album.

Early life 
Miller was born in Cardiff, Wales with his mother, father and two sisters and started singing in primary school.

Career

The Voice UK 
Miller applied to go on X Factor initially but failed and he then tried pursuing music again by applying to be on The Voice UK. On the show, he progressed and got onto Jennifer Hudson's team. He got through the Blind auditions, the Battle Round, the Live Shows, the Semi Finals and the Final. Miller ultimately finished third.

Atlantic Records 
Miller produced covers of songs from Adele and Lewis Capaldi, which were promoted by Khloé Kardashian on her Instagram. This prompted Atlantic Records to offer him a recording contract. Since then he has played in various concerts including The Globe and performed in various venues before moving to Los Angeles. He has since written and released original songs ("The City That Never Sleeps", "Onto Something", "Hold You 'Til We're Old" and "Here's Your Perfect") and co-wrote Paloma Faith's song "Loyal".

Jesse McCartney tour 
Jesse McCartney invited Miller to open up for him for his The New Stage tour around the USA. Jamie debuted his Broken Memories album live on this tour.

Calum Scott tour 
Miller was the opening act during the North American leg of Calum Scott's "Bridges" World Tour in summer, 2022.

Discography

Singles

Albums

Soundtrack appearances

Awards 

 Young and Promising International Artist - SCTV Music Awards (2022)

References

Living people
Welsh singer-songwriters
1997 births
21st-century Welsh male singers
British male singer-songwriters
British emigrants to the United States
Welsh emigrants to the United States